The Pike's Peak Gold Rush (later known as the Colorado Gold Rush) was the boom in gold prospecting and mining in the Pike's Peak Country of western Kansas Territory and southwestern Nebraska Territory of the United States that began in July 1858 and lasted until roughly the creation of the Colorado Territory on February 28, 1861. An estimated 100,000 gold seekers took part in one of the greatest gold rushes in North American history.

The participants in the gold rush were known as "Fifty-Niners" after 1859, the peak year of the rush and often used the motto Pike's Peak or Bust! The name Pike's Peak Gold Rush was used mainly because of how well known and important Pike's Peak was at the time.

Overview

The  Pike's Peak Gold Rush, which followed the California Gold Rush by approximately one decade, produced a dramatic but temporary influx of migrants and immigrants into the Pike's Peak Country of the Southern Rocky Mountains. The rush was exemplified by the slogan "Pike's Peak or Bust!", a reference to the prominent mountain at the eastern edge of the Rocky Mountains that guided many early prospectors to the region westward over the Great Plains. The prospectors provided the first major European-American population in the region.

The rush created a few mining camps such as Denver City and Boulder City that would develop into cities. Many smaller camps such as Auraria and Saint Charles City were absorbed by larger camps and towns. Scores of other mining camps have faded into ghost towns, but quite a few camps such as Central City, Black Hawk, Georgetown, and Idaho Springs survived.

Discovery

For many years, people had suspected the mountains in present-day Colorado contained numerous rich gold deposits. In 1835, French trapper Eustace Carriere lost his party and ended up wandering through the mountains for many weeks. During those weeks he found many gold specimens which he later took back to New Mexico for examination. Upon examination, they turned out to be "pure gold". But when he tried to lead an expedition back to the location of where he found the gold, they came up short because he could not quite remember the location.

In 1849 and 1850, several parties of gold seekers bound for the California Gold Rush panned small amounts of gold from various streams in the South Platte River valley at the foot of the Rocky Mountains. The Rocky Mountain gold failed to impress or delay men with visions of unlimited wealth in California, and the discoveries were not reported for several years.

As the hysteria of the California Gold Rush faded, many discouraged gold seekers returned home. Rumors of gold in the Rocky Mountains persisted and several small parties explored the region. In the summer of 1857, a party of Spanish-speaking gold seekers from New Mexico worked a placer deposit along the South Platte River about 5 miles (8 kilometers) above Cherry Creek, now part of metropolitan Denver.

William Greeneberry "Green" Russell was a Georgian who worked in the California gold fields in the 1850s. Russell was married to a Cherokee woman, and through his connections to the tribe, he heard about an 1849 discovery of gold along the South Platte River. Green Russell organized a party to prospect along the South Platte River, setting off with his two brothers and six companions in February 1858. They rendezvoused with Cherokee tribe members along the Arkansas River in present-day Oklahoma and continued westward along the Santa Fe Trail. Others joined the party along the way until their number reached 107.

Upon reaching Bent's Fort, they turned to the northwest, reaching the confluence of Cherry Creek and the South Platte on May 23. The site of their initial explorations is in present-day Confluence Park in Denver. They began prospecting in the river beds, exploring Cherry Creek and nearby Ralston Creek but without success. In the first week of July 1858, Green Russell and Sam Bates found a small placer deposit near the mouth of Little Dry Creek that yielded about 20 troy ounces (622 grams) of gold, the first significant gold discovery in the Rocky Mountain region. The site of the discovery is in the present-day Denver suburb of Englewood, just north of the junction of U.S. Highway 285 and U.S. Highway 85.

Initial boom

The first decade of the boom was largely concentrated along the South Platte River at the base of the Rocky Mountains, in the canyon of Clear Creek in the mountains west of Golden City, at Breckenridge and in South Park at Como, Fairplay, and Alma. By 1860, Denver City, Golden City, and Boulder City were substantial towns that served the mines. Rapid population growth led to the creation of the Colorado Territory in 1861.

The Pike's Peak Gold Rush sent many Americans into a frenzy, prompting them to pack up their belongings and head to Colorado. This initial boom influenced people to begin falsifying information, often sending people out to the west without any proof of a true presence of gold. As early as the spring of 1859, people raced to the Pike's Peak country. Some even dared to go out in the winter of 1858 to try to get a head start, only to realize that they would have to wait until the snow melted to begin mining.

Free gold

Hardrock mining boomed for a few years, but then declined in the mid-1860s as the miners exhausted the shallow parts of the veins that contained free gold, and found that their amalgamation mills could not recover gold from the deeper sulfide ores. Colorado produced 150,000 ounces of gold in 1861 and 225,000 troy ounces in 1862.  This led Congress to establish the Denver Mint.  Cumulative Colorado production by 1865 was 1.25 million ounces, of which sixty percent was placer gold.

See also
Australian gold rushes
Colorado Silver Boom
Horace Greeley, namesake of Greeley, Colorado, who mined for gold in the rush
Klondike Gold Rush
Silver mining in Colorado
Ute people
Witwatersrand Gold Rush

References

External links

American gold rushes
Gold mining in Colorado
Colorado Mining Boom
Pikes Peak
1858 in Kansas Territory
American frontier
Kansas Territory
Jefferson Territory
Economy of Colorado
Mining in Colorado
Pre-statehood history of Colorado
1858 in the United States
19th century in Colorado